Clepsis burgasiensis is a species of moth of the family Tortricidae. It is found in Bulgaria and North Macedonia.

The wingspan is 14–16 mm. The ground colour of the forewings is ochreous yellow with red-brown markings. The hindwings are dark brownish grey. Adults have been recorded on wing from August to October.

References

Moths described in 1916
Clepsis